Jim Gooch Jr. (born April 13, 1951) is an American politician and a Republican member of the Kentucky House of Representatives representing District 12 since January 1995. Gooch was the mayor of Providence, Kentucky from 1982 until 1986.

Elections
1994 Gooch won the four-way 1994 Democratic Primary and was unopposed for the November 8, 1994 General election.
1996 Gooch was challenged in the 1996 Democratic Primary, but won, and was unopposed for the November 5, 1996 General election.
1998 Gooch was challenged in the three-way 1998 Democratic Primary, but won, and was unopposed for the November 3, 1998 General election.
2000 Gooch was challenged in the three-way 2000 Democratic Primary, winning with 1,641 votes (53.7%) and was unopposed for the November 7, 2000 General election, winning with 8,967 votes.
2002 Gooch was challenged in the 2002 Democratic Primary, winning with 5,906 votes (73.8%) and was unopposed for the November 5, 2002 General election, winning with 7,159 votes.
2004 Gooch was unopposed for both the 2004 Democratic Primary and the November 2, 2004 General election, winning with 9,973 votes.
2006 Gooch was unopposed for both the 2006 Democratic Primary and the November 7, 2006 General election, winning with 8,630 votes.
2008 Gooch was unopposed for both the 2008 Democratic Primary and the November 4, 2008 General election, winning with 12,739 votes.
2010 Gooch was challenged in the May 18, 2010 Democratic Primary, winning with 5,731 votes (77.8%) and was unopposed for the November 2, 2010 General election, winning with 9,842 votes.
2012 Gooch was challenged in the May 22, 2012 Democratic Primary, winning with 1,569 votes (66.0%) and was unopposed for the November 6, 2012 General election, winning with 12,394 votes.

References

External links
Official page  at the Kentucky General Assembly

Jim Gooch, Jr. at Ballotpedia
Jim Gooch Jr. at OpenSecrets

Place of birth missing (living people)
1951 births
Living people
Kentucky Democrats
Mayors of places in Kentucky
Members of the Kentucky House of Representatives
People from Providence, Kentucky
Kentucky Republicans
21st-century American politicians